Jaguar is a 2016 Indian vigilante action film, produced by H. D. Kumaraswamy under his banner Channambika Films and directed by Mahadev. Shot simultaneously in Kannada and Telugu, it features Nikhil Gowda, who is the son of the producer H. D. Kumaraswamy, and Deepti Sati in the lead roles, while Tamannaah made a cameo appearance with this film, thus marking her debut in Kannada cinema. The music was composed by S. Thaman, and the fight scenes were choreographed by Ram-Lakshman.

The film was released worldwide on 6 October 2016.

Plot 
Krishna, a youngster, disguises himself in a vigilante costume and kills a Judge, where he telecasts it on Live AIR from SS Channels, a leading news channel and escapes from the watchmen, who tried to catch him. 

Krishna joins SS medical college where he behaves carefreely and also earns the irk of senior student leader Arya, Krishna soon falls for Priya, who is Arya's sister where she is irritated by his antics, but warms up to him after he saved a patient. Meanwhile, Ajay is a womanizer, who is the son of SS College Chairman Somnath Prasad where Somanath warns him to stay away from the students. Meanwhile, Ajay (wearing a helmet) tries to molest Priya, (who is later revealed to be Krishna disguised) where she escapes and reveals the incident to Arya where he and the students form a strike in front of the college.

Meanwhile, A CBI officer is appointed to investigate the Judge's death where he dubs the killer as JAGUAR and interrogates SS Channel CEO Shouri Prasad, whom he pays no heed to. Somnath Prasad hires ACP Encounter Shankar to call off the students' strike. However, he is killed by Krishna in an amusement park. Meanwhile, Krishna steals Arya's phone and sends the pictures of himself and the SS Brothers and Ajay to the CBI officer, stating that he will kill them, thus making the SS Brothers believe that Arya is the JAGUAR suspect. 

Meanwhile, The SS Brothers invite Krishna to stay in their house to know about JAGUAR. Meanwhile, Ajay plans to kidnap Arya as FAKE JAGUAR where he plans to kill him in Live-Air but was saved by Krishna (REAL JAGUAR) where he kills Ajay. The SS Brothers plan to kill Arya, but Krishna tells them to bribe him. When they meet, Arya denies it and throws Krishna out. The SS brothers plan to tarnish Arya's reputation when they reveal to Krishna about Shivaprasad, who is an altruistic doctor and also reveal that they tarnished his reputation by framing him for the murder of school girl in the villager where he committed suicide. 

However, Krishna brings his mother to their house, where he reveals to them that he is actually the son of Dr.Shivaprasad and also exposes their crimes to the people by inserting live-camera in their house. Krishna then kills the henchman and Somnath Prasad. A chase ensues in which, Krishna brings Shouri Prasad who kills him with the help of Arya and the college students. Krishna reunites with his mother and Priya where he apologizes to Arya for his behavior, to which he accepts.

Cast

 Nikhil Kumar as Krishna/Jaguar 
 Deepti Sati as Priya, Krishna's love interest and Arya's sister
 Jagapathi Babu as CBI Officer
 Aadarsh Balakrishna as Arya, Priya's brother
 Rao Ramesh as Dr. Shivaprasad, Krishna's father
 Ramya Krishna as Krishna's mother 
 Sampath Raj as Shouri Prasad
 Adithya Menon as Somnath Prasad
 Vidyullekha Raman as Priya's friend
 Avinash as College Principal 
 Raghu Babu as CBI Officer Raghu
 Saurav Lokesh as Ajay 
 Supreeth as "Encounter" Shankar
 Ravi Kale as Judge
 Sadhu Kokila (Kannada version) as Fake Jaguar
 Brahmanandam (Telugu version) as Fake Jaguar
 Prashanth Siddi
 Kavita Radheshyam (Guest Appearance)
 Tamannaah - cameo appearance in the song "Sampige"

Production
In December 2015, it was revealed that Nikhil Kumar, son of H. D. Kumaraswamy and grandson of Devegowda, would be making his acting debut with the film titled Jaguar for which the story was written by Vijayendra Prasad. H.D Kumarswamy invited Tollywood actor Pawan Kalyan to attend the audio function.

Release 
The film was released worldwide on 6 October 2016 in over 1000 screens and approximately across 16 countries.

Home media 
The digital rights of the film were sold to Amazon Prime Video and Kasthuri, but was later sold to Colors Kannada and was telecasted on 22 January 2023.

Music 

The film's soundtrack album and background score are composed by S. S. Thaman. The soundtrack comprises six tracks.

Awards and nominations

References

External links
 

2016 films
2010s Telugu-language films
2010s Kannada-language films
Indian romantic action films
Films scored by Thaman S
Indian multilingual films
2016 masala films
Techno-thriller films
Indian heist films
Films shot in Bangalore
Films shot in Switzerland
Films shot at Ramoji Film City
2016 multilingual films
2010s heist films